Tanberry may refer to:

Tanberry Creek: see List of watercourses in Western Australia, T-V
Mrs. Tanberry: a character in The Two Vanrevels by Booth Tarkington